Survival in space may refer to:
 Space and survival, about survival of humanity by space colonization
 Survivability of individuals in space, as described in:
Life support system
 Effect of spaceflight on the human body